Vanguard Award may refer to:

 ASCAP Vanguard Award, an annual award presented by the American Society of Composers, Authors and Publishers (ASCAP)
 GLAAD Vanguard Award, an annual award presented by the Gay & Lesbian Alliance Against Defamation at the GLAAD Media Awards
 Michael Jackson Video Vanguard Award, a special award presented at the MTV Video Music Awards